Michael Richard Gratwicke Earls-Davis (21 February 1921 − 5 April 2016) was an English cricketer who played for Cambridge University in 1947 and for Somerset in 1950. He was born at Hampstead, London.

Biography

Educated at Sherborne School, Earls-Davis went up to Cambridge University but, like many students of his time, then joined the armed forces during World War II. He was an officer in the Irish Guards and was wounded in action in 1944. He was thus 26 by the time he started his first-class cricket career as a lower-order left-handed batsman and a right-arm fast-medium bowler at Cambridge in 1947. In his first game, against Worcestershire, he took five wickets in the match, including Don Kenyon twice. In the following match against Gloucestershire, he took four wickets for 87 in the county's first innings, and these proved to be the best bowling figures of his career. But he did not maintain this form and dropped out of the team before the University Match, and therefore did not win a Blue.

In wartime non-first-class matches, Earls-Davis had played for Sussex and he appeared in a second eleven match in 1947, scoring 58 as a middle-order batsman. But by 1949 he was playing non-first-class matches for Somerset and in 1950, when the Somerset captaincy was a matter for discussion following the resignation of the 1949 captain, George Woodhouse, Earls-Davis was one of several amateurs mentioned as potentially available. In the event, he played only once, making four runs and bowling five wicket-less overs on a spinners' wicket at Worcester.

Outside cricket
Earls-Davis returned to Sherborne School as a teacher. He married in 1958 and had two sons and a daughter. He died on 5 April 2016.

References

1921 births
2016 deaths
English cricketers
Somerset cricketers
Cambridge University cricketers